Territory=Universe is the second album by Acumen Nation. It was originally released on Fifth Colvmn Records in 1996. A version with additional tracks was released on Conscience Records on May 5, 1998.

Track listing

Fifth Colvmn Records version
"Stone Farm" – 6:01
"DJentrify" – 4:09
"Candy Prowled" – 4:58
"You Deal with This" – 6:16
"Queener" – 4:26
"Nothing Changes" – 4:35
"Mister Sandman I Am" – 3:44
"Crazy Stalked Eyes" – 8:15
"Fuckface" – 5:46
"Mike (Thyroid Mix)" – 4:36

Conscience Records version
"Stone Farm" – 6:01
"DJentrify" – 4:09
"Candy Prowled" – 4:58
"You Deal with This" – 6:14
"Queener" – 4:24
"Nothing Changes" – 4:35
"Mister Sandman I Am" – 3:44
"Crazy Stalked Eyes" – 8:15
"Fuckface" – 5:38
"Mike (Thyroid Mix)" – 4:36
"Mike (Remix)" – 4:55
"Queener (Remix)" – 6:25

Personnel
Jason Novak – programming, guitar, vocals
Jamie Duffy – guitar, engineering
Gregory Lopez – drums, bass, moog
Ethan Novak – guitar, drums, bass guitar, washboard

Acumen Nation albums
1996 albums
Fifth Colvmn Records albums